A personal knowledge base (PKB) is an electronic tool used to express, capture, and later retrieve the personal knowledge of an individual. It differs from a traditional database in that it contains subjective material particular to the owner, that others may not agree with nor care about. Importantly, a PKB consists primarily of knowledge, rather than information; in other words, it is not a collection of documents or other sources an individual has encountered, but rather an expression of the distilled knowledge the owner has extracted from those sources or from elsewhere.

The term  was mentioned as early as the 1980s, but the term came to prominence in the 2000s when it was described at length in publications by computer scientist Stephen Davies and colleagues, who compared PKBs on a number of different dimensions, the most important of which is the data model that each PKB uses to organize knowledge.

Data models
Davies and colleagues examined three aspects of the data models of PKBs:

 their , which prescribes rules about how knowledge elements can be structured and interrelated (as a tree, graph, tree plus graph, spatially, categorically, as n-ary links, chronologically, or ZigZag);
 their , or basic building blocks of information that a user creates and works with, and the level of granularity of those knowledge elements (such as word/concept, phrase/proposition, free text notes, links to information sources, or composite); and
 their , which involves the level of formal semantics introduced into the data model (such as a type system and related schemas, keywords, attribute–value pairs, etc.).

Davies and colleagues also emphasized the principle of transclusion, "the ability to view the same knowledge element (not a copy) in multiple contexts", which they considered to be "pivotal" to an ideal PKB. They concluded, after reviewing many design goals, that the ideal PKB was still to come in the future.

Personal knowledge graph
In their publications on PKBs, Davies and colleagues discussed knowledge graphs as they were implemented in some software of the time. Later, other writers used the term personal knowledge graph (PKG) to refer to a PKB featuring a graph structure and graph visualization. However, the term  is also used by software engineers to refer to the different subject of a knowledge graph  a person, in contrast to a knowledge graph  a person in a PKB.

Software architecture 
Davies and colleagues also differentiated PKBs according to their software architecture: file-based, database-based, or client–server systems (including Internet-based systems accessed through desktop computers and/or handheld mobile devices).

History 
Non-electronic personal knowledge bases have probably existed in some form for centuries: Leonardo da Vinci's journals and notes are a famous example of the use of notebooks. Commonplace books, annotated private libraries, and card files (in German) of index cards and edge-notched cards are examples of formats that have served this function in the pre-electronic age.

Undoubtedly the most famous early formulation of an electronic PKB was Vannevar Bush's description of the "memex" in 1945. In a 1962 technical report, human–computer interaction pioneer Douglas Engelbart (who would later become famous for his 1968 "Mother of All Demos" that demonstrated almost all the fundamental elements of modern personal computing) described his use of edge-notched cards to partially model Bush's memex.

Examples
In their 2005 paper, Davies and colleagues mentioned the following, among others, as examples of software applications that had been used to build PKBs using various data models and architectures:
Open source
 Compendium (software)
 Haystack (MIT project)
Closed source
 MyLifeBits
 NoteCards
 Personal Knowbase
 PersonalBrain
 Tinderbox (application software)

See also

 
 
 
 
 Comparison of notetaking software

References

Knowledge representation